Argyrotaenia bialbistriata is a species of moth of the family Tortricidae. It is found in the state of Durango in Mexico and Arizona in the United States.

The length of the forewings is 9.8–9.9 mm for males and 9.5–10 mm for females. The forewings are pale red brown with a whitish to yellowish-white longitudinal streak. The hindwings are white with pale grey overscaling.

Etymology
The species name refers to the two white longitudinal streaks of the forewings of the females.

References

bialbistriata
Moths of Central America
Moths of North America
Moths described in 2000